The McDowell Valley AVA is an American Viticultural Area located in southeastern Mendocino County, California near Hopland. McDowell Valley is slightly cooler than the surrounding areas of Mendocino County. There is currently only one winery operating within the boundaries of the AVA, McDowell Valley Vineyards.

See also
Mendocino County wine

References

External links
 McDowell Valley: Mendocino County Wines

American Viticultural Areas
American Viticultural Areas of California
American Viticultural Areas of Mendocino County, California
1981 establishments in California